Mart Kadastik (born March 24, 1955) is an Estonian journalist, the editor in chief of Estonia's largest daily Edasi/Postimees 1977–1998, and executive director and chairman of the board of Eesti Meedia since 1998, the media group in Estonia controlling about one third of the national press market.

References

1955 births
Living people
Estonian journalists
People from Tartu
University of Tartu alumni
Recipients of the Order of the White Star, 3rd Class